Nathan Bedford Forrest High School may refer to:

Forrest School (Chapel Hill, Tennessee), named for Nathan Bedford Forrest
Nathan B. Forrest High School, former name of Westside High School in Jacksonville, Florida